The 2018–19 season was the 33rd season in Segunda División played by Granada CF, a Spanish football club based in Granada, Andalusia. It covers a period from 1 July 2018 to 30 June 2019.

Squad

Transfers

In

Out

Pre-season and friendlies

Competitions

Segunda División

Results summary

Result round by round

Matches

Copa del Rey

Second round

Statistics

Appearances and goals
Last updated on 6 April 2019

|-
! colspan=14 style=background:#dcdcdc; text-align:center|Goalkeepers

|-
! colspan=14 style=background:#dcdcdc; text-align:center|Defenders

|-
! colspan=14 style=background:#dcdcdc; text-align:center|Midfielders

|-
! colspan=14 style=background:#dcdcdc; text-align:center|Forwards

|-
! colspan=14 style=background:#dcdcdc; text-align:center|Players who have made an appearance this season but have left the club

|}

References

External links 

Granada CF seasons
Granada CF